INS Kuthar is a , currently in service with the Indian Navy. It was designed by Indian naval architects and built at Mazagon Dock in Mumbai. INS Kuthar was part of Western Naval Command till 1998 later it moved to be part of Eastern Naval Command. It was damaged in a mishap that occurred on 15 July 2014. The mishap occurred after the naval ship returned to the port after completing a mission.

Maritime exercise
 Kuthar was one of the six ships of Eastern Naval Command which was part of naval exercise in Bay of Bengal on the eve of Navy week celebrations in the year 2005.
 Missile corvette Kuthar along with INS Satpura and INS Ranvijay represented the Indian Navy in the first ever Japan-India maritime exercise (JIMEX) which was held in the Bay of Bengal from 19 December to 22 December 2013.

Incidents
 Sub Lieutenant Tejveer Singh died on Tuesday October 11, 2016 onboard INS Kuthar after he accidentally fired his 9mm pistol. Singh fired the round accidentally at around 1430 hours and was injured. He was then shifted to Naval Hospital INHS Kalyani in Visakhapatnam wherein he succumbed to his injuries.

References

Khukri-class corvettes
Corvettes of the Indian Navy
Naval ships of India
1989 ships
Ships built in India